Wang Lei, (born August 12, 1986 in Jinan, Shandong), is a professional basketball player from the People's Republic of China. Wang currently plays for the Bayi Rockets, a Chinese Basketball Association team based in Ningbo. He is a forward. He is 2.03 m (6'8") in height and he weighs 95 kg (210 pounds).

External links
Wang Lei statistics at Sina.com

1986 births
Living people
Basketball players from Henan
Basketball players at the 2008 Summer Olympics
Bayi Rockets players
Chinese men's basketball players
Olympic basketball players of China
Qingdao Eagles players
Sportspeople from Jinan
Shanxi Loongs players
Small forwards
Xinjiang Flying Tigers players